The Men's 1500 metres competition at the 2020 World Single Distances Speed Skating Championships was held on February 16, 2020.

Results
The race was started at 13:25.

References

Men's 1500 metres